Fabian is the English form of the late Roman name Fabianus. This was a name originally given to those adopted into or descended through the female line from a Roman family named Fabius, that derived from the Latin faba for the broad bean, an important food crop in antiquity. It entered the English language with the Normans, but has never achieved the popularity of Fabien in France, Fabio or Fabiano in Italy and Portugal, and Fabián in Spain.

Fabian, or its variants, may also be a surname.

Given name
 Fabian (died 250), Pope, saint, martyr
 Fabian (born 1943), American singer, actor
 Fabian Aichner (born 1990), Italian professional wrestler
 Fabian Allen (born 1995), Jamaican cricketer
 Fabian Almazan (born 1984), Cuban born American pianist, composer
 Fabian Andre (1910–1960), American composer
 Fabian Arndt (born 1995), German footballer
 Fabian Bäcker (born 1990), German footballer
 Fabian Bachrach (1917–2010), American photographer
 Fabian Barański (born 1999), Polish rower
 Fabian Barbiero (born 1984), Australian footballer 
 Fabian Baumgärtel (born 1989), German footballer 
 Fabian Gottlieb von Bellingshausen (1778–1852), Baltic German-Russian naval officer, cartographer, explorer
 Fabian Benko (born 1998), Croatian-German footballer
 Fabian Beqja (born 1994), Albanian footballer
 Fabian Birkowski (1566–1636), Polish writer, preacher
 Fabian Blattman (born 1958), Australian Paralympic track, field athlete
 Fabian Böhm (born 1989), German handball player
 Fabian Bohn (born 1982), Dutch DJ, producer, stage name Brennan Heart
 Fabian Booysen (born 1992), South African rugby union player
 Fabian Bourzat (born 1980), French ice dancer
 Fabian Bredlow (born 1995), German footballer
 Fabian Broghammer (born 1990), German footballer
 Fabian Brunnström (born 1985), Swedish ice hockey player
 Fabian Bruskewitz (born 1935), American Roman Catholic Church prelate 
 Fabian Cancellara (born 1981), Swiss professional road cyclist
 Fabian Coulthard (born 1982), English-New Zealand race car driver
 Fabian Davis (born 1974), Jamaican footballer 
 Fabian Dawkins (born 1981), Jamaican footballer
 Fabian Cowdrey (born 1993), English cricketer 
 Fabian Delph (born 1989), English Footballer
 Fabian Dörfler (born 1983), German slalom canoeist
 Fabian Döttling (born 1980), German chess Grandmaster 
 Fabian Drzyzga (born 1990), Polish volleyball player
 Fabian Eberle (born 1992), Liechtensteiner footballer
 Fabian Ehmann (born 1998), Austrian footballer
 Fabian Eisele (born 1995), German footballer
 Fabian Ernst (born 1979), German footballer
 Fabian Fernando (born 1995), Sri Lankan cricketer
 Fabian von Fersen (1626–1677), Swedish general, freelord, field marshal, governor general
 Fabian von Fersen (1762–1818), Swedish count, politician, officer, courtier
 Fabian Florant (born 1983), Dominican-Dutch triple jumper
 Fabian Forde (born 1981), English footballer 
 Fabian Forte (born 1943), American singer, actor
 Fabian Francis (born 1973), Australian rugby league footballer, Australian rules football player
 Fabian Franke (born 1989), German footballer
 Fabian Franklin (1853–1939), Hungarian-American engineer, mathematician, journalist
 Fabian Friedrich (born 1980), German swimmer
 Fabian Freyenhagen (born 1978), British philosopher
 Fabian von Fersen (1762–1818), Swedish courtier, politician
 Fabian Frei (born 1989), Swiss footballer 
 Fabian Gaffke (1913–1992), American baseball player
 Fabian Giefer (born 1990), German footballer
 Fabian Gmeiner (born 1997), Austrian footballer
 Fabian Goodall (born 1994), Australian-Fijian footballer
 Fabian Götze (born 1990), German footballer 
 Fabian Guerra (born 1995), American football player
 Fabian Hambüchen (born 1987), German gymnast 
 Fabian Hamilton (born 1955), British politician
 Fabian Heimpel (born 1990), German international rugby union player
 Fabian Heinle (born 1994), German long jumper
 Fabian Herbers (born 1993), German footballer
 Fabian Hinrichs (born 1974), German actor
 Fabian Holland (footballer) (born 1990), German footballer
 Fabian Holthaus (born 1995), German footballer
 Fabian Holzer (born 1992), German badminton player
 Fabian Jackson (1902–1978), Trinidad and Tobago Anglican Bishop
 Fabian Jacobi (born 1973), German politician
 Fabian Jeker (born 1968), Swiss road bicycle racer
 Fabian Johnson (born 1987), American soccer player 
 Fabian Joseph (born 1965), Canadian ice hockey player
 Fabian Juries (born 1979), South African rugby union player
 Fabian Kahl (born 1991), German art and antique dealer; author
 Fabian Kalig (born 1993), German footballer
 Fabian Kasi (born 1967), Ugandan accountant, bank executive, businessman
 Fabian Kastner (born 1977), Swedish writer, literary critic
 Fabian Kauter (born 1985), Swiss épée fencer 
 Fabian Keller (born 1982), Swiss ice dancer
 Fabian Kiessling (born 1972), German radiologist, university lecturer, author
 Fabian Kizito (born 1990), Ugandan footballer 
 Fabian Kling (born 1987), German footballer
 Fabian Klos (born 1987), German footballer
 Fabian Lagman (born 1962), Argentine footballer
 Fabian Lamotte (born 1983), German footballer
 Fabian Leimlehner (born 1987), Austrian artistic gymnast 
 Fabian Lienhard (born 1993), Swiss cyclist
 Fabian Lokaj (born 1996), Albanian footballer 
 Fabian Lustenberger (born 1988), Swiss footballer 
 Fabian Lysell (born 2003), Swedish ice hockey player
 Fabian Manning (born 1964), Canadian politician
 Fabian Månsson (1872–1938), Swedish socialist
 Fabian McCarthy, several individuals
 Fabian Molina (born 1990), Swiss politician
 Fabian Monge (born 2001), Australian footballer
 Fabian Moreau (born 1994), American football player
 Fabian Msimang (born 1960), South African Air Force officer
 Fabian Müller (born 1964), Swiss composer
 Fabian Müller (born 1986), German footballer
 Fabian Nicieza (born 1961), Argentine-American comic book writer
 Fabian Norberg (born 1995), Swedish ice hockey player
 Fabian Núñez (born 1966), American politician
 Fabian Nürnberger (born 1999), German footballer 
 Fabian O'Dea (1918–2004), Canadian lawyer, politician 
 Fabian van Olphen (born 1981), Dutch handball player
 Fabian Gottlieb von der Osten-Sacken (1752–1837), Baltic German-Russian field marshal
 Fabian Osuji (born 1942), Nigerian politician, educator
 Fabian Picardo (born 1972), Gibraltarian politician, barrister 
 Fabian Plak (born 1997), Dutch volleyball player
 Fabian Reese (born 1997), German footballer
 Fabian Reid (born 1991), Jamaican footballer
 Fabian Ribauw (born 1971), Nauruan politician
 Fabian Rieder (born 2002), Swiss footballer
 Fabian Rießle (born 1990), German Nordic combined skier
 Fabian Rohner (born 1998), Swiss footballer
 Fabian Roosenbrand (born 1988), Dutch darts player
 Fabian Russell (born 1968), Australian conductor, music educator
 Fabian Schaar (born 1989), German track and road racing cyclist
 Fabian Schär (born 1991), Swiss footballer 
 Fabian Schiller (born 1997), German racing driver
 Fabian von Schlabrendorff (1907–1980), German jurist; soldier; member, German resistance, World War II
 Fabian Schleusener (born 1991), German footballer 
 Fabian Schmitt (born 1992), German Greco-Roman wrestler 
 Fabian Schnabel (born 1993), German footballer 
 Fabian Schnaidt (born 1990), German road bicycle racer
 Fabian Schnellhardt (born 1994), German footballer 
 Fabian Schönheim (born 1987), German footballer 
 Fabian Schrödter (born 1982), German water polo player
 Fabian Schubert (born 1994), Austrian footballer 
 Fabian Schulze (born 1984), German pole vaulter
 Fabian Schwingenschlögl (born 1991), German swimmer 
 Fabian Sejanes (born 1969), Argentine equestrian
 Fabian Senninger (born 1996), German-Nigerian footballer
 Fabian Serrarens (born 1991), Dutch footballer 
 Fabian Spiess (born 1994), German footballer 
 Fabian Sporkslede (born 1993), Dutch footballer 
 Fabian Stang (born 1955), Norwegian lawyer, politician
 Fabian Stenzel (born 1986), German footballer
 Fabian Steinheil (1762–1831), Baltic German-Russian military officer, governor general
 Fabian Stoller (born 1988), Swiss footballer
 Fabian Tamm (1879–1955), Swedish naval officer
 Fabian Taylor (born 1980), Jamaican footballer
 Fabian Teușan (born 1988), Romanian footballer
 Fabian Trettenbach (born 1991), German footballer
 Fabian Udekwu (1928–2006), Nigerian cardiac surgeon 
 Fabian Varesi, Italian composer, keyboardist
 Fabián Vargas (born 1980), Colombian footballer
 Fabian Velardes (born 1984), Argentinian boxer
 Fabian Ver (1920–1998), Filipino military officer 
 Fabian Wagner (born 1978), German cinematographer
 Fabian Ware (born 1869), founder, Commonwealth War Graves Commission
 Fabian Washington (born 1983), American Football player 
 Fabian Wegmann (born 1980), German road racing cyclist
 Fabian Weinhandl (born 1987), Austrian ice hockey player
 Fabian Weiß (born 1992), German footballer
 Fabian Wetter (born 1989), German footballer
 Fabian Wiede (born 1994), German handball player 
 Fabian Wilkens Solheim (born 1996), Norwegian alpine ski racer
 Fabian Wilnis (born 1970), Dutch footballer 
 Fabian Windhager (born 2001), Austrian footballer 
 Fabian S. Woodley (1888–1957), English newspaperman, poet
 Fabian Wrede (1641–1712), Swedish politician
 Fabian Zetterlund (born 1999), Swedish ice hockey player
 Quintus Fabius Maximus Verrucosus ca. 280 BC – 203 BC, Roman politician, general, eponym of Fabian strategy

Surname
Andrew Fabian (born 1948), British astronomer, astrophysicist
Ava Fabian (born 1962), American model, actress
Christopher Fabian (born 1980), American technologist
Dušan Fabian (born 1975), Slovak writer
Eva Fabian (born 1993), American-Israeli world champion swimmer 
Genah Fabian (born 1989), New Zealand mixed martial artist
Jud Fabian (born 2000), American baseball player
Lara Fabian (born 1970), Canadian-Belgian singer
Miri Fabian (born 1943), Israeli actress
Patrick Fabian (born 1964), American actor

References

Masculine given names
Albanian masculine given names
Dutch masculine given names
English masculine given names
German masculine given names
Swiss masculine given names